"Tongues" is a song by American indie rock band Joywave and American electronic music band KOPPS. The song was released independently on April 9, 2013 and then through Cultco Music and Hollywood Records on February 9, 2014, was featured on the band's second extended play How Do You Feel?, their second mixtape 88888, and appeared on the band's debut studio album How Do You Feel Now?. The official music video for the song was uploaded on May 27, 2014 to the band's Vevo channel on YouTube. The song has been remixed by several artists, including Giorgio Moroder and Big Data. The song was featured on the soundtrack for the video game FIFA 15 and appears in a Nexus 6P advertisement.

Music video
The official music video for the song, lasting three minutes and fifty-five seconds, was uploaded on May 27, 2014 to the band's Vevo channel on YouTube. The video, which also features a NSFW tag, was directed by duo DANIELS, who also worked on the MTV VMA-nominated music video for "Turn Down for What" by DJ Snake and Lil Jon.

Track listing

CD-R

Digital download

Charts

Release history

References

2014 singles
2014 songs
Hollywood Records singles